Callistoprionus is a genus of beetles in the family Cerambycidae. It is monotypic, being represented by the single species Callistoprionus fasciatus.

References

Prioninae
Monotypic Cerambycidae genera